Styled To Rock may refer to:

 Styled to Rock (American TV series)
 Styled to Rock (British TV series)